The Angolan multimammate mouse (Mastomys angolensis) is a species of rodent in the family Muridae.
It is found in Angola and Democratic Republic of the Congo. It was formerly classified in the genus Myomyscus but has been reclassified into the genus Mastomys. 
Its natural habitats are dry savanna and moist savanna.

References

Mastomys
Mammals described in 1890
Taxonomy articles created by Polbot
Taxobox binomials not recognized by IUCN